Mufaddal Saifuddin ( is the spiritual leader, the 53rd Da'i al-Mutlaq of one million Dawoodi Bohras, a subgroup of the Tayyibi, Mustaali, Ismaili Shia branch of Islam. He is the second son of the 52nd Da'i al-Mutlaq, Mohammed Burhanuddin, whom he succeeded in 2014. Saifuddin has led a number of cultural, social, and economic initiatives. In Islamic Cairo, he rebuilt shrines of the Ahl al-Bayt and led the restoration of medieval Fatimid architecture, notably Al-Anwar Mosque, Al-Aqmar Mosque, Al-Juyushi Mosque, and Lulua Mosque. In Yemen, he has spearheaded several campaigns to improve socio-economic conditions of the inhabitants of the Haraaz region, introducing sustainable agricultural systems, improving local infrastructure and providing equal access to education for children.

Saifuddin oversees community programs throughout the world, such as the Saifee Burhani Upliftment Project in Mumbai’s Bhendi Bazaar, Project Rise (a Dawoodi Bohra global philanthropic initiative), and the FMB community kitchen, which work towards socio-economic development, environmental conservation, food security and reducing food waste.

Early life 

Mufaddal Saifuddin was born on 20 August 1946 (23 Ramadan 1365 A.H.) in Surat, India, and was given the name Aali Qadr Mufaddal (Arabic:عالي قدر مفضل, Abjad value 1365, which corresponds to his Islamic year of birth) by his grandfather Taher Saifuddin. His kunya is Abu Jafar us Sadiq and his laqab is Saifuddin.

During the era of his grandfather Taher Saifuddin, he began the recitation of the Quran in Saifee Villa, Colombo. He received much of his spiritual tutelage from his father, Mohammed Burhanuddin, and his father-in-law, Yusuf Najmuddin, the late rector of Aljamea-tus-Saifiyah. He completed his undergraduate education in India and Egypt, where he had a custom-tailored study programme that involved scholars from Cairo's leading universities including the historic Al-Azhar University and Cairo University. In 1969, he graduated from Aljamea-tus-Saifiyah in Surat with the al-Faqih al-Jayyid degree (the Distinguished Jurist). In 1971, he was conferred with the degree of al-Aleem al-Baari (the Outstanding Scholar).

Saifuddin married Jawharatusharaf Najmuddin, daughter of Yusuf Najmuddin, on 1 January 1970.

At 22 years of age, his father Burhanuddin designated him as his successor by performing nass (appointment by designation) on him in 1969, and later in 2005 and 2011.

Saifuddin was appointed Amirul Hajj by his father Burhanuddin in 1390 AH (1970 CE). After Hajj, he travelled to Karbala, Najaf, Syria, Misr and Yemen. In Yemen, he laid the foundation for the 3rd Da'i al-Mutlaq Hatim's mausoleum. After that journey, Burhanuddin bestowed upon him the honorific title Aqeeq-ul-Yemen in 1391 AH/1971 AD.

Saifuddin often accompanied his father Mohammed Burhanuddin on his travels.

Projects 

Saifuddin led numerous projects for the restoration of medieval Fatimid mosques in Egypt and other Islamic edifices. Projects include the restoration and revival of Al-Hakim Mosque (al-Jamea al-Anwar), the restoration of the masjid of Zoeb bin Moosa in 1406H, the restoration of Aqmar Mosque in 1408H, construction of the mosque of Abdullah ibn Muhammad ibn Ismail in Salamiyah in 1414H, restoration of the Lulua Mosque and Juyushi Mosque in 1416H, construction of the zareeh of Zaynab bint Ali in Cairo in 1416H, construction of the Mashhad Ras al-Husayn in Ashkelon in 1421H, the construction of the Mazar and Mosque of Hatim bin Ibrahim in 1425H, and the discovery of the burial places of eight Da'i al-Mutlaq in Yemen.

During his centenary birthday celebrations, in 2011, Mohammed Burhanuddin announced that a new Aljamea tus Saifiyah campus would be built in Nairobi, Kenya. The construction of this 14 acre campus commenced in 2013, and was inaugurated by Mufaddal Saifuddin and the President of Kenya, Uhuru Kenyatta on 20 April 2017.

Office of al-Dai al-Mutlaq 
Mufaddal Saifuddin is the present and 53rd Da'i al-Mutlaq of the Tayyibi Isma'ili Dawoodi Bohra community, appointed by his predecessor and father, Syedna Mohammed Burhanuddin.

Deputies 
On 18 Dhu al-Hijjah 1435 (12 October 2014 AD), Saifuddin elevated his uncle Husain Husamuddin to the rank of Mazoon al-Dawat and appointed his uncle Qasim Hakimuddin as Mukasir al-Dawat at a religious gathering held in Mumbai.

On 20 Rabi' al-Thani 1439H (7 January 2018 AD), Saifuddin elevated Qasim Hakimuddin to the rank of Mazoon and appointed his uncle Ali Asgar Kalimuddin as Mukasir at a religious gathering in Surat.

On 27 Jumada al-Thani 1440H (4 March 2019 AD), Saifuddin elevated Ali Asgar Kalimuddin to the rank of Mazoon and appointed his brother Qaidjoher Ezzuddin as Mukasir at a religious gathering in Ahmedabad.

Philanthropy

Saifee Burhani Upliftment Trust 
Saifuddin's father, Mohammed Burhanuddin, conceived the Bhendi Bazaar Redevelopment Project and a public charitable trust named the Saifee Burhani Upliftment Trust was created on 23 January 2009 with an initial corpus provided by settlors Shahzada Qaidjoher Ezzuddin and Shahzada Abbas Fakhruddin. The first phase was inaugurated by Saifuddin on 18 May 2016. "About 250 dilapidated buildings in Bhendi Bazaar will be replaced with 17 new towers with wide roads, modern infrastructure, more open spaces and highly visible commercial areas." This ambitious philanthropic enterprise "aims to rehabilitate 3200 families and 1250 business which are currently living in poor conditions." It is expected to reach completion by 2025.

Donations 

Saifuddin donated US$53,000 to Tanzanian public schools. The same month, a local community led by Saifuddin donated TSh 545 million toward earthquake relief efforts in Tanzania.

On 27 April 2017, Saifuddin donated KSh  for Beyond Zero initiative towards maternal and child health to Margaret Kenyatta, First Lady of Kenya.

On 19 July 2018, Saifuddin met Abdel Fattah el-Sisi and expressed interest in investing in Egypt. Saifuddin also donated  (US$621,553) to the Long Live Egypt Fund (Tahya Misr), matching his own donation from 2014.

In September 2019, Saifuddin met with President Maithripala Sirisena of Sri Lanka and donated Rs 10 million/- (US$53,553) to National Kidney Fund of Sri Lanka to enhance facilities and improve welfare and preventive care for patients impacted by chronic kidney disease. In the same month, Saifuddin made a "significant contribution" to the Relief Fund of Chief Minister of Maharashtra to aid with rehabilitation efforts post 2019 Indian floods. In October 2019 Saifuddin donated Rs.5 million/- to National Cancer Institute, Maharagama towards infrastructure and capacity expansion of its Bone Marrow Transplant Unit.

In October 2019, Saifuddin donated 60,000 seed balls to Kenya, and a month later, on the occasion of his 76th birthday per the Islamic calendar, he donated 76,000 more which were utilized to grow over 35,000 indigenous tree species at Amboseli National Park.

In May 2021, Saifuddin donated 1 crore/- towards the purchase of medical equipment for the Jawaharlal Nehru Medical College Hospital at Aligarh Muslim University during the second wave of the COVID-19 pandemic.

Faiz al-Mawaid al-Burhaniyah 
To ensure that not a single community member goes hungry, Saifuddin has actively expanded the worldwide community kitchen scheme, named Faiz al-Mawaid al-Burhaniyah (Arabic:فيض الموائد البرهانية). Every day, a Tiffin or Thali consisting of a fully prepared and cooked meal is delivered to each Dawoodi Bohra community household free of cost.

To reduce food wastage, Saifuddin introduced a regulation to strictly limit the number of dishes served in any community, social or personal gathering where Dawoodi Bohras are present. This was launched under the motto of ek kharaas, ek mithaas, no israaf (one savoury, one dessert and no wastage). Approximately 7000 Dana Committee volunteers world-wide are tasked with eliminating food wastage at community dinners.

Social Upliftment 
In December 2016 Saifuddin initiated a social 'Upliftment Program', to improve the living standards of his community members. Over 4,100 volunteers from India, East Asia, Europe, North America and the Middle East were spread out over 200 towns and cities. The 5-day upliftment drive consisted of free renovation of houses, planting of trees and shrubs, upgrading sanitation of community properties and grounds, building playground and sports facilities, dental hygiene and vaccination camps, a sports day and a community breakfast on New Year's Day.

He has also launched a global initiative named Project Rise to help improve the lives of people that are marginalized, neglected or living in poverty. In partnership with government bodies and local organizations around the world, Project Rise's upliftment programs span a range of policy areas, including healthcare, nutrition, sanitation and hygiene, environmental responsibility and conservation, and education. These initiatives provide humanitarian aid during natural disasters such as the COVID-19 pandemic.

Saifee Burhani Medical Association 

Saifuddin, on his first visit to North America, established Saifee Burhani Medical Association (America), on 14 March 2015, chaired by his brothers, Qaidjoher Ezzuddin, Qusai Vajihuddin, Ammar Jamaluddin, and his son, Husain Burhanuddin. The charter of the association is to run free medical clinics, mentor students, and facilitate professional development.

Recognition

Literary Works

Rasāʾil Ramaḍāniyya (Epistles) 
A list of Risalah composed by Mufaddal Saifuddin, or started by Taher Saifuddin and Mohammed Burhanuddin but completed by Mufaddal Saifuddin:

Qasidah (Poetry)

Ashara Mubaraka

Travels 

Saifuddin travels extensively to various Dawoodi Bohra community centers year-round to meet his followers, deliver sermons, organise local communities, kickstart social projects, and commemorate important religious functions.

Surat, the erstwhile seat of Dawat and home to the original Aljamea-tus-Saifiyah campus, and Mumbai, the current seat of Dawat and home to Raudat Tahera, are host to most events. Karachi, owing to a large presence of followers outside India, sees more visits from Saifuddin than average. Colombo, Tanzania, and Kenya are other rather smaller community centers to which Saifuddin travels often.

Saifuddin visits centers in Yemen, Egypt, and Iraq for their religious and historical importance. Saifuddin also often travels to various places of pilgrimage within India like Taherabad in Rajasthan; Ahmedabad, Jamnagar, Mandvi, and Delmal in Gujarat; Burhanpur and Ujjain in Madhya Pradesh; especially to commemorate annual remembrance of the Duaat and Hudood Kiram buried there.

On April 27, 2022, Syedna, with President of Egypt, Abdel Fattah El Sisi inaugurated Imam Al-Hussein Mosque in Cairo after renovation works to the mosque and the area surrounding it, including the new lounge of the holy shrine of Imam Al-Hussein.

Succession 

The 52nd Da'i al-Mutlaq of the Dawoodi Bohras, Syedna Mohammed Burhanuddin, died on 17 January 2014. As per the tenets of the faith each predecessor is required to nominate his successor during his lifetime. His death sparked a succession crisis where a rival emerged for the title of 53rd Dā'ī al-Mutlaq: against Syedna Mufaddal Saifuddin, Khuzaima Qutbuddin of the Dawoodi Bohra.

The challenge created a divide in the community with the majority aligning with Mufaddal Saifuddin and a smaller number aligned with Khuzaima Qutbuddin. Mufaddal Saifuddin assumed control of the Dawoodi Bohra administration and community infrastructure. In March 2014, Khuzaima Qutbuddin filed civil suit 337/2014 in the Bombay High Court against Mufaddal Saifuddin in which he sought a declaration that he was validly appointed as the 53rd Dai al-Mutlaq. The UK Charity Commission has taken the view "that His Holiness Syedna Mufaddal Saifuddin is the current incumbent of the office of Dai al-Mutlaq."

Genealogy 
Saifuddin is a lineal descendant of the Islamic prophet Muhammad and the Islamic prophet Ibrāhīm.

Saifuddin is also a descendant of Fakhr al-Din Shaheed, Abd al-Qadir Hakimuddin, Khanji Pheer, and Syedi Lukman.

Notes

References 

Dawoodi Bohras
1946 births
Living people
Dawoodi Bohra da'is
Indian Ismailis
People from Surat
Indian spiritual teachers
Indian philanthropists
21st-century Ismailis
Recipients of orders, decorations, and medals of Madagascar